The Gizhiga (Koryak: Вуйвов’эем) is a river in Magadan Oblast, Russian Far East.

The name of the river probably originated in the Chukchi "Ḳtig" (Ӄитиг), meaning "frost" or "cold wind". In Koryak it is known as "Vuyvov'eyem" (Вуйвов’эем), meaning "fortress river".

Course 
The Gizhiga has its source in the Korbendya Range of the eastern Kolyma Mountains. It flows in a roughly eastern direction about half its course. Then it bends first southeastwards, and then southwestwards in its last stretch, within a floodplain where it divides into multiple sleeves and where there are many small thermokarst lakes. Finally it flows by Gizhiga village into the Gizhigin Bay, at the northern end of Shelikhov Gulf, Sea of Okhotsk.

Flora and fauna 
The main fish species in the Gizhiga river include grayling, pike and Eurasian minnow. Chum salmon, pink salmon and coho salmon come into the river for spawning. Beluga whales are found in the estuary area of the river.

See also
List of rivers of Russia

References

External links
Kolyma - Modern Guidebook to Magadan Oblast

Rivers of Magadan Oblast
Drainage basins of the Sea of Okhotsk